Partial list of notable past and current union shops, branches, or international unions belonging to the Industrial Workers of the World.

Industrial Unions 
 Agricultural Workers Organization, later Agricultural Workers Industrial Union
 Australasian Meat Industry Employees Union (disaffiliated in the 1920s)
 Bakery Workers' Industrial Union (existed in 1919)
 Construction Workers' Industrial Union (existed in 1919)
 Coal Miners' Industrial Union (existed in 1919)
 Fishermen's Industrial Union (existed in 1919)
 Foodstuff Workers' Industrial Union (existed in 1919)
 Furniture Workers' Industrial Union (existed in 1919)
 General Distribution Workers' Industrial Union (existed in 1919)
 Hotel, Restaurant and Domestic Workers' Industrial Union (existed in 1919)
 Lumber Workers Industrial Union
 The Brotherhood of Timber Workers
 Marine Transport Workers Industrial Union
 Metal and Machinery Workers Industrial Union (dissolved in the 1950s)
 Metal Mine Workers' Industrial Union
 Motor Transport Workers Industrial Union
 Oil Workers' Industrial Union (existed in 1919)
 Printing and Publishing Workers' Industrial Union (existed in 1919)
 Railroad Workers' Industrial Union (existed in 1919)
 Rubber Workers' Industrial Union (existed in 1919)
 Shipbuilding Workers' Industrial Union (existed in 1919)
 Textile Workers' Industrial Union (formerly National Industrial Union of Textile Workers, United States)
 Western Federation of Miners (only briefly affiliated)

Shops

 Just Coffee Cooperative
 Jimmy John's Workers Union
 Ottawa Panhandlers' Union
 Peoples' Wherehouse
 Red and Black Cafe (2009–2014)
 Red Emma's Bookstore Coffeehouse
 Starbucks Workers Union
 Street Labourers of Windsor
 United Campaign Workers

See also
 Industrial Workers of the World organizational evolution

References

 
Industrial